Southern Cayuga High School is a secondary school (grades 7–12) in Poplar Ridge, Cayuga County, New York.

SCHS is operated by Southern Cayuga Central School District.

In 2003 it had some 585 students and 45 teachers. The student body was 98% white, and 24% were eligible for free lunch, higher than the state average of 15%. Its New York State School Report Card reports that it exceeded all three required standards (graduation in English and Mathematics, and dropout rate) in 2001.

The school's student-produced newspaper is called The Source, and is associated with a one-semester journalism class.

Southern Cayuga is one of eleven places in the United States that will receive a sapling from the tree outside of Anne Frank's house.

As of 2012, the school has moved to one campus, and Emily Howland Elementary is going to be auctioned off. The community also pays the superintendent way too much and has a very corrupt board.

Selected former principals 
Previous assignment and reason for departure denoted in parentheses
Ms. Mimi Trudeau ?-2002
Mr. James De Rusha–2002-2003
Mr. Dennis Farnsworth–2003-2005
Mrs. Karen Simon–2005-2006(Principal - Southern Cayuga Middle School, named Assistant Principal of North Street Elementary School)

References

External links 
 Southern Cayuga Central School
 publicschoolreview.com

Public high schools in New York (state)
Schools in Cayuga County, New York
Public middle schools in New York (state)